Rick Wakeman is an English keyboardist, composer and songwriter, most known as the keyboard player for progressive rock group Yes. His solo albums have sold over 50 million copies.

Solo

Albums

1970s

1980s

1990s

2000s

2010s

2020s

Non-album singles
Note: These are singles that were not taken from a regular album. These songs were only released in these singles or were included on future compilations.
1985: "Lytton's Diary" (for a TV series of the same name)
1994: "Light Up the Sky"

Compilations
1997 Voyage (sub-titled "The Very Best of Rick Wakeman"; digitally remastered 2-CD set)
1999 The Masters: compilation of tracks from the 1980s
2000 Recollections: The Very Best of Rick Wakeman 1973-1979
2002 Songs of Middle Earth (Inspired by The Lord of the Rings)
2004 Revisited (re-recordings of past material)
2015 After the Ball: The Collection (same tracks as Recollections)
2017 The Journey: The Essential Rick Wakeman: Spectrum 3CD compilation from the A&M years. The 3rd CD features all of Lisztomania and White Rock.

Video games
1993 Microcosm

With band or duo

With Strawbs

Other collaborations
Beyond the Planets (1984, with Jeff Wayne and Kevin Peek)
Creepshow 2 (1987, with Les Reed)
From Brush and Stone (2009, with Gordon Giltrap)
Starmus (2014, with Brian May)

Guest appearances

References

External links
Strawbs Discography
Rick Wakeman Discography

Discography
Discographies of British artists
Rock music discographies